Methembe Ndlovu (born 16 August 1973) is a former Zimbabwean footballer and current head coach of men's soccer at Trinity College (Connecticut). Ndlovu spent his playing career with Albuquerque Geckos, Highlanders F.C., Boston Bulldogs and as a player/coach for Cape Cod Crusaders and Indiana Invaders.

Ndlovu made several appearances for the Zimbabwe national football team, including an appearance at the 1998 COSAFA Cup.
Methembe Ndlovu was recently appointed for the US coaching role for Soccer. He is said to be the last coach to lead the team Highlanders to the Premium Soccer League title after Bulawayo giants according to the article NewZimbabwe.com.

References

External links

1973 births
Living people
Zimbabwean footballers
Zimbabwean expatriate footballers
Zimbabwe international footballers
Dartmouth Big Green men's soccer players
Albuquerque Geckos players
Boston Bulldogs (soccer) players
Cape Cod Crusaders players
Indiana Invaders players
Expatriate soccer players in the United States
A-League (1995–2004) players
USL League Two players
Highlanders F.C. players
Highlanders F.C. managers
Association football midfielders
USL Second Division players
Zimbabwean football managers
Zimbabwean expatriate sportspeople in the United States